Marcel Tabuteau (2 July 18874 January 1966) was a French-American oboist who is considered the founder of the American school of oboe playing.

Life
Tabuteau was born in Compiègne, Oise, France, and  given a post in the city's municipal wind band at age eleven.  He then studied at the Conservatoire de Paris with the legendary oboist Georges Gillet.

Walter Damrosch brought Tabuteau, together with French musicians flutist Georges Barrère, bassoonist Auguste Mesnard, clarinetist Leon Leroy, and Belgian trumpeter Adolphe Dubois to New York in 1905 to play in his New York Symphony Orchestra. Damrosch was fined by the musicians' union for not advertising for musicians from New York, but the emigrating musicians were allowed to stay. In 1906 Tabuteau returned to France to complete his three years of compulsory military service as a French citizen, and served as a military musician in the regimental band of the 45th Infantry Regiment in Compiègne. A French law that had been enacted on July 11, 1892 gave special consideration to graduates of the Conservatoire, allowing him to be demobilized after just one year of service. He returned to the United States in 1907 and the union again tried to have him expelled, on the grounds that there had been a break in his US residence since filing his first citizenship papers.  The union was unsuccessful and Tabuteau became a US citizen in 1912.  

Tabuteau served as principal oboist of the Philadelphia Orchestra from 1915 to 1954 under Leopold Stokowski and Eugene Ormandy, and just as importantly,  taught in Philadelphia at the Curtis Institute of Music. There his classes included Oboe, Woodwind and String Ensembles, Orchestral Winds/Percussion Class, and combined ensembles. He taught at  Curtis from 1925 until his retirement in 1954.

Legacy

During the thirty years during which Tabuteau taught at the Curtis Institute of Music, he came to exercise a decisive influence on the standards of oboe playing in the whole United States, as well as raising the level of woodwind achievement in general. Nor was the impact of his teaching confined to wind instruments  alone, as is evidenced by the many string players and pianists who attended his classes.

References

Further reading
Storch, Laila. 2008. Marcel Tabuteau: How Do You Expect to Play the Oboe if You Can't Peel a Mushroom?. Bloomington and London: Indiana University Press.  (cloth). Reprinted 2017  (pbk). Reprinted as ebook, 2018 .

External links
 Marcel Tabuteau, profile written by Laila Storch and published in To the World's Oboists by the International Double Reed Society
 Marcel Tabuteau First Hand, a comprehensive website containing first-hand documentation of the teachings, performances, career and daily life of Marcel Tabuteau.
 A Little Garlic, an article about Marcel Tabuteau in Time magazine, Nov. 20, 1939.

1887 births
1966 deaths
People from Compiègne
Conservatoire de Paris alumni
French classical oboists
American classical oboists
Male oboists
Curtis Institute of Music faculty
Chevaliers of the Légion d'honneur
Musicians of the Philadelphia Orchestra
20th-century French musicians
20th-century American musicians
20th-century French male musicians
20th-century American male musicians
20th-century classical musicians
French emigrants to the United States